Patrick Karhan (born 19 June 2003) is a Slovak footballer who plays for Spartak Trnava as a midfielder.

Club career

Spartak Trnava
Karhan made his Fortuna Liga debut for Spartak Trnava in a home fixture at Štadión Antona Malatinského on 2 May 2021 in a traditional derby against Slovan Bratislava. He came on in the 86th minute to replace Martin Bukata with the score set at 3-0, following a two penaltiy goals by Milan Ristovski and a second-half strike by Bamidele Yusuf. Less than two minutes into his debut, Karhan was involved in an in-play incident with Bulgarian international Vasil Bozhikov during an attempt to header the ball. Karhan had struck Bozhikov, who suffered an injury and had to be taken off the pitch. Subsequently, Erik Gemzický had awarded Karhan with a red card. This foul was judged as a youthful over-motivation or inexperienced misjudgment after the match by the media. The result meant that Slovan was denied the opportunity to celebrate title retention.

In June 2022, Karhan signed his first professional contract with Spartak along with Marek Ujlaky, whose father Marek played over 400 matches for Spartak and collected caps for Slovakia. Both players were to succeed their fathers in their careers and serve as a motivation for other Academy players of Spartak Trnava, according to club President Peter Macho.

Personal life
Karhan was born in Wolfsburg, Germany. Karhan is the son of Miroslav Karhan, who managed Spartak Trnava and played over 200 matches for them, featured in over 280 matches in the Bundesliga, while playing for Wolfsburg and Mainz 05 and was the first player to collect 100 caps for the Slovak national team (107 in total), holding the record for the most capped player until it was beaten by Marek Hamšík in 2018. He also has a younger brother named Alex Thomas.
He studied high school at a sports gymnasium in Trnava.

References

External links
 Futbalnet profile 
 
 

2003 births
Living people
People from Wolfsburg
Slovak footballers
Slovakia youth international footballers
Association football midfielders
FC Spartak Trnava players
Slovak Super Liga players